Phil Bloom (born 27 November 1945 in Berkel en Rodenrijs) is a Dutch artist, graphic designer and performer. She was the first person to appear completely nude on Dutch television, on 28 July 1967 during the show Hoepla, which caused scandal and controversy at the time. Afterwards, she followed a passionate career in painting, photography and performance art. She was a member of the Fluxus network in 1967. A notable performance of hers is titled "Lemniscaat" which takes place in Lapland. 

She currently still works and lives in Amsterdam.

Sources

External links

 Phil Bloom's website
 Hoepla 4 teruggevonden! Verboden VPRO-uitzending na veertig jaar voor het eerst te zien  Bericht 4 januari 2008, VPRO 

1945 births
Living people
Dutch artists
People from Lansingerland
Fluxus